40S ribosomal protein S25 (eS25) is a protein that in humans is encoded by the RPS25 gene.

Ribosomes are cellular macromolecules that catalyze protein synthesis across all kingdoms of life. The eukaryotic ribosome consists of a small 40S subunit and a large 60S subunit. Together these subunits are composed of 4 RNA species and approximately 80 distinct proteins. The RPS25 gene encodes the eukaryote-specific ribosomal protein eS25 that is a component of the 40S subunit. As is typical for genes encoding ribosomal proteins, there are multiple processed pseudogenes of this gene dispersed through the genome.

Interactions 

Besides the interactions that position eS25 at its location in the E site region of the 40S ribosomal subunit, eS25 has been suggested to interact with other cellular proteins. One study has found that eS25 interacts with MDM2 as part of a regulatory feedback loop that stabilizes p53. Additionally, eS25 has been shown to interact with CDC5L.

Function 
As a ribosomal protein, eS25 likely plays a role in general protein synthesis; however, the RPS25 gene is non-essential for cellular viability in budding yeast and in select mammalian cell lines, implying that it is not essential for eukaryotic protein synthesis. Studies have implicated eS25 in the control of several specialized forms of translation, including that mediated by viral IRESs.

See also 
Eukaryotic translation
40S ribosomal subunit
IRES

References

Further reading 

 
 
 
 
 
 
 
 
 
 
 
 
 
 

Ribosomal proteins